Tha Sawang is a subdistrict (tambon) of Mueang Surin District, Surin Province, northeastern Thailand.

Geography
Neighboring subdistricts are (from the north clockwise) Na Di, Kae Yai, Nok Mueang and Kho Kho of Mueang Surin, Surin Province and Nong Teng, Chumsaeng, and Lamduan of Krasang District, Buriram Province.

Economy

Agriculture is the main activity of the sub-district, with rice and vegetables as the main products. The second job of the people in the area is silk weaving. The brocade/silk from this sub-district was selected as the official souvenir of the APEC Summit 2003 in Bangkok.

Administration
The tambon is administered by a tambon administrative organization (TAO). It is divided into 20 villages (mubans).

Gallery

External links
thaitambon.com (Thai)

Tha Sawang